Thomas Scott Fennell (January 9, 1928 – January 27, 2012) was a Progressive Conservative party member of the House of Commons of Canada. He was an insurance executive and businessman by career.

He was elected to the Ontario electoral district in 1979 and re-elected there in the 1980 and 1984 elections. Fennell left national politics in 1988 and did not campaign in that year's election, having served in the 31st, 32nd and 33rd Canadian Parliaments.

Father of Scott, Geoffrey, and Lisa Fennell. Uncle of Robert Fennell Young.

External links
 

1928 births
2012 deaths
Members of the House of Commons of Canada from Ontario
Progressive Conservative Party of Canada MPs